The 1974 Torneo Godó or Trofeo Conde de Godó was a men's tennis tournament that took place on outdoor clay courts at the Real Club de Tenis Barcelona in Barcelona, Spain. It was the 22nd edition of the tournament and was part of the 1974 Grand Prix circuit. It was held from 14 October through 20 October 1974. Fourth-seeded Ilie Năstase won his second consecutive singles title at the event.

Finals

Singles
 Ilie Năstase defeated  Manuel Orantes 8–6, 9–7, 6–3
 It was Năstase's 6th singles title of the year and the 42nd of his career.

Doubles
 Juan Gisbert /  Ilie Năstase defeated  Manuel Orantes /  Guillermo Vilas 3–6, 6–0, 6–2

See also
 1974 Barcelona WCT

References

External links
 ITF tournament edition details
 Official tournament website
 ATP tournament profile

Barcelona Open (tennis)
Torneo Godo
Torneo Godo
Torneo Godo